Norma Pujol i Farré (born 9 February 1988) is a Spanish teacher and politician from Catalonia and a member of the Congress of Deputies of Spain.

Early life
Pujol was born on 9 February 1988 in Flix, Catalonia. She has a diploma in music education from the University of Lleida (UdL) (2009) and a postgraduate qualification in music education from the Autonomous University of Barcelona (2010). In 2018 she received a postgraduate degree in management and management of educational centers from UdL.

Career
Pujol has taught music in several municipalities in Catalonia since 2010 and from 2015 she worked in Ebre Zona Escolar Rural (rural school zone). She has taught music as an after-school activity at the Maristes Montserrat de Lleida and was a collaborator with the Flix Municipal School of Music and the Tivissa Music School. She was territorial co-ordinator for Terres de l'Ebre between 2016 and 2018. In September 2018 she was appointed Director General of Youth for the Government of Catalonia.

Pujol is a member of several cultural and sports organisations including the Agrupació Sardanista, Assemblea Nacional Catalana, Associació Cultural la Cana, Associació de Jocs Tothom a Taula, Centre d'Estudis de la Ribera d'Ebre, Flexus Teatre, Grup Natura Freixe and Joventut Esportiva de Flix. She was chairperson of the Flix Yacht Club from 2012 to 2015. She was part of the editorial staff of La Veu de Flix, a local news magazine, from 2008 to 2015.

Pujol has been associated with Republican Left of Catalonia (ERC) since 2007. She contested the 2015 local elections as an Entesa per Flix–Acord Municipal (EpF-AM) electoral alliance candidate in Flix and was elected. She was re-elected at the 2019 local elections. She contested the April 2019 general election as a Republican Left of Catalonia–Sovereigntists electoral alliance candidate in the Province of Tarragona and was elected to the Congress of Deputies. She was re-elected at the November 2019 general election.

Electoral history

Notes

References

External links

1988 births
Autonomous University of Barcelona alumni
Educators from Catalonia
Women politicians from Catalonia
Living people
Members of the 13th Congress of Deputies (Spain)
Members of the 14th Congress of Deputies (Spain)
Spanish municipal councillors
People from Ribera d'Ebre
Republican Left of Catalonia politicians
Spanish music educators
University of Lleida alumni
Women members of the Congress of Deputies (Spain)